Cornelis "Kees" Bol (September 21, 1916 – September 16, 2009) was a Dutch painter and art educator. His work was exhibited in art galleries and museums throughout the Netherlands, as well as in Paris. In 1950 Bol was awarded the Thérèse van Duyl-Schwartze Prize and in 1982 he was made Knight in the Order of the Netherlands Lion.

Biography
Bol was born in Oegstgeest. Initially he was a florist in his home town. After moving to Eindhoven in 1935, he held corporate jobs at Bata Shoes and Philips. In 1941 he married Toos van 't Hof. In 1946 he turned to art, studying at the Royal Academy of Art in The Hague with Paul Citroen, Han van Dam, Jan Heesters, and Henk Meijer. In 1947 he moved to Tongelre, Eindhoven where he worked as a painter and taught at the Design Academy Eindhoven.

In 1970 he moved to Heusden. He also spent considerable time painting in France.

At the Design Academy Eindhoven, back at the Royal Academy of Art and in his studio Bol educated scores of art students, among whom Helen Berman, Frans Clement, Els Coppens-van de Rijt, Frank Dekkers, Frank Letterie, Har Sanders, and Hans van Vroonhoven. His three sons, Henri (1945-2000), Peter (born 1947), and Guillaume (born 1950), have also become visual artists.

Opposite what had been his home and studio from 1947 in Eindhoven, a park was named in his honor. This park contains Bol's bust. On October 7, 1991 the Dutch broadcaster NCRV aired a special about the painter.

Bibliography
 Bol, Peter en  Henriëtte Verburgh (2005) Kees Bol. Kees Bol Foundation.
 Verburgh, Henriëtte (2001) Kees Bol: portretten van Toos. Wijk: Pictures Publishers, .
 Beks, Maarten (1991) Kees Bol: 1974-1991. Hapert: De Kempen Pers, .
 Puijenbroek, Frans van en Lambert Tegenbosch (1976). Kees Bol. Eindhoven: Stedelijk Van Abbemuseum.
 Wessem, Jan N. van (1957) Kees Bol. Leiden: De Lakenhal.

References

External links
Kees Bol - Unofficial website
Kees Bol page at the Dutch Office for Art History Documentation
Kees Bol page at Galerie Gijsbrecht Bol
Kees Bol page at artnet.com
Kees Bol page at askart.com
Kees Bol page at bkrkunst.nl
guillaumebol.com

1916 births
2009 deaths
Art educators
Academic staff of Design Academy Eindhoven
People from Eindhoven
People from Oegstgeest
20th-century Dutch painters
Dutch male painters
Royal Academy of Art, The Hague alumni
Academic staff of the Royal Academy of Art, The Hague
20th-century Dutch male artists